Chenopodium suecicum is a species of flowering plant belonging to the family Amaranthaceae.

Synonyms:
 Chenopodium album f. pseudopulifolium Scholz
 Chenopodium pseudopulifolium (Scholz) Murr

References

suecicum